The Miaolingian is the third Series of the Cambrian Period, and was formally named in 2018. The Miaolingian is preceded by the unnamed Cambrian Series 2 and succeeded by the Furongian series.

Definition 
A number of proposals for fossils and type sections were made before it was formally ratified in 2018. The most promising fossil markers were seen to be the respective first appearances of either trilobite species Ovatoryctocara granulata or Oryctocephalus indicus, which both have an age close to  million years ago. After some deliberation, the FAD of Oryctocephalus indicus was chosen to be the lower boundary marker, and the GSSP was placed in Wuliu-Zengjiayan, Guizhou, China.

The Miaolingian-Furongian boundary has the same definition as the Paibian Stage. It is defined as the first appearance of Glyptagnostus reticulatus around  million years ago.

Subdivision
The Miaolingian is subdivided into the following stages:

References

 
03
Geological epochs